Ingeborg Strandin (18 November 1881 – 8 March 1948) was a Swedish opera singer and actress.

Born in Stockholm as Ingeborg Lublin, Strandin made her film debut in the 1919  film His Lordship's Last Will directed by Victor Sjöström, and went on to participate in over 15 films.

Selected filmography
 Boman at the Exhibition (1923)
 A Maid Among Maids (1924)
 The Marriage Game (1935)
 John Ericsson, Victor of Hampton Roads (1937)

External links

1881 births
1948 deaths
Singers from Stockholm
Actresses from Stockholm
Swedish film actresses
Swedish silent film actresses
20th-century Swedish actresses
20th-century Swedish women opera singers